Ion Borşevici (March 21, 1929 – 2011) - was a Moldovan diplomat. Ambassador Extraordinary and Plenipotentiary of Moldova to Ukraine.

He served as a member of the Parliament of Moldova.

References

External links 
 Cine au fost şi ce fac deputaţii primului Parlament din R. Moldova (1990-1994)?
 Declaraţia deputaţilor din primul Parlament
 Site-ul Parlamentului Republicii Moldova

2011 deaths
Moldovan MPs 1990–1994
Popular Front of Moldova MPs
1929 births